Estes is an unincorporated community in Aransas County, in the U.S. state of Texas. According to the Handbook of Texas, its population was 50 in 2000. It is located within the Corpus Christi metropolitan area.

History
Estes was reported to first be settled around the 1800s. The first settlers, couple Addison and Joyce William Barber bought a plot of land on which to raise cattle. More farmers moved to the community and was named Estes Flats. A post office was established at Estes in 1909 and remained in operation until 1914. It was unknown if it had other businesses at the same time. A hurricane hit the community in 1919, causing slow growth for Estes. There was a business and several houses in the community in 1936, along with the Texas and New Orleans Railroad. Estes continued to struggle during the second half of the 20th century and had several scattered houses and 50 residents, which stayed at that number through 2000. Besides Estes Flats, Estes Cove was also a landmark in the community.

Geography

Education
Estes had its own school by the time its post office opened. Another one-room school was built in 1935 and remained that next year. The school then moved to nearby Rockport. Today, the community is served by the Aransas County Independent School District.

See also
 Redfish Bay

References

Unincorporated communities in Aransas County, Texas
Unincorporated communities in Texas